"One to One" is the fourth single by British jazz-funk band Freeez. The single was released by Beggars Banquet.

Although the single failed to chart, the song appeared on the band's greatest hits album, Anti-Freeez, in 1984.

Track listing
 "One To One" - 5:35
 "One To One" (Instrumental)

Credits
Produced by Mark Arthurworrey
Remixed by Paul O'Duffy

References

See also
Freeez
Freeez discography

1982 singles
Freeez songs
1982 songs
Beggars Banquet Records singles
Virgin Records singles